GeTai Challenge 2018, is the second season of GeTai Challenge, a hit reality-singing competition organised by Mediacorp Channel 8, returning after a three-year hiatus. The second season consist of 17 episodes premiered on Channel 8 on 20 April 2018, with the grand finals taped on 26 July 2018 at MES Theatre and aired on 10 August 2018. For the first time, the episodes were available on catchup on Gov.sg's YouTube channel, in addition to the Toggle website (unlike the last season, all episodes were uploaded) The show was sponsored by the Ministry of Communications and Information.

On 10 August 2018, 50-year old Getai veteran singer and sister of resident judge Liu Lingling, Angie Lau was declared the winner of GeTai Challenge 2018 and took home a $20,000 cash award; 45-year old restaurant owner Jason Chung was named the runner-up and won $10,000. Jessie Yeong finished in third place, while Zhuang Qing Yu and Cola Lau finished in fourth and fifth place respectively; they each won $5,000, $3,000 and $2,000, respectively.

The show won the Best Variety Programme in the Star Awards 2019.

Development
The show was first announced on 12 March 2018 with the auditions happening in February 2018, where Allen Moo and Peter Chen were the judges. Out of hundreds of auditionees with an age range of between 12 and 63, 20 singers were selected and put through to the shows.

The new theme song, "大家兴旺发", was first unveiled to the public during the Lunar New Year Special on 15 February 2018 (Hao Hao and Wina Xie were absent), and their music video was uploaded on YouTube on 6 April 2018. The video was composed by resident judge Jim Lim, lyrics by last season runner-up Marcus Chin, and featured all of the season 1 finalists, except for Wina Xie.

The three judges who were resident judges from the first season, Jim Lim, Liu Lingling and Wang Lei, returned this season, while Chen Hanwei did not return. Pornsak reprises his hosting role, while Desmond Ng, the winner of the last season, replaces Wang Weiliang as the co-host of the show. Two supporting hosts, Dennis Chew and Ho Ai Ling, portrayed their roles of Kachang Puteh Man and Kiam Sng Tee Auntie, respectively, on segments for the community.

Unlike the last season airing on prime-time slot (Mondays at 8pm), the show was aired on every Fridays at 11.30am. Additionally, where GeTai Challenge was a Mandarin Chinese television program, most of the dialogue was presented in Hokkien dialect, similar to another program aired on a morning time-slot Eat Already? and Happy Can Already!.

Contestants
The Top 20 contestants were announced on the premiere episode, as follows:

Lai's Chinese name was 赖宇涵, but the on-screen captions was displayed as Jaspers instead.

Scoring chart

Red numbers indicate the lowest score for each week
Green numbers indicate the highest score for each week
 the singer eliminated that week
 the singer was placed in risk of elimination
 the winning singer
 the runner-up singer
 the third-place singer

Show details
Unless otherwise stated, all the group performances (except for weeks 2, 9, 14 and 16) at the start of the show were "大家兴旺发", the show's theme song. Starting in Week 3 until 15, the song was shortened to fit in the 1-hour time slot. All season 1 finalists lists only nine of ten finalists, with the exception of Wina Xie.

Week 1/2 (20/27 April)- Prelude
The first two shows were taped at MPC@Khatib on 6 April 2018, showcasing all the singers' (nine from Season 1 and 20 from Season 2) performances.

Week 3/4 (4/11 May)- Battle For Top 10 (Part 1)- Preliminary Rounds
This is the first show of the season to be taped at Mediacorp Studios at 1 Stars Avenue. For the next two weeks, 20 singers were paired up and performed with one of nine Season 1 singers (Leon & Febe paired with four singers instead of two) to vie for the 10 spots in the next round. The result was decided solely through judges' votes; judges cast their vote through their tablet device by flashing either one of the three Heng Ong Huat logos. Singers receiving all three judges' votes would directly advance to the top 10, but singers receiving only one or two judges' votes will land them into Pending Zone, where they were eligible to be saved from the judges' immunity (each immunity may be used once on each show). Singers either receiving no judges' votes or were not saved by the judges from the Pending Zone, will be eliminated from the competition.
Theme: Alumni duets (billed as "Duet with Seniors")

 Color key

Week 5 (18 May)- Battle For Top 10 (Part 2)- Final Round
The six singers who were saved by the judges will have to face the Final Round to compete for the last two spots in the Top 10. The two singers receiving the two highest scores will advance to the top 10.
Theme: Contestant's choice (billed as "Songs they were good at")

 Color key

Week 6/7 (25 May/1 June)- Top 10 Rounds (Part 1)- Themed Rounds
Starting from week six, the ten singers will be judged based on their performance and assigned a score, based on Costume, Performance, Presentation (20 each) and Singing Techniques (40). The scores were accumulated until week nine, and the singer receiving the lowest cumulative score afterwards will be eliminated from the competition. For the next four weeks, Jim Lim was absent in his judging role due to work commitments; Mediacorp actor Cavin Soh took his place on the panel.
Theme: Songs to remember their loved ones (billed as "Those Were The Days" (Week 6) or "What I Miss" (Week 7))

Week 8/9 (8/15 June)- Top 10 Rounds (Part 2)- Team Battle
The round was split into two episodes with the ten singers assigned into two groups of five. For this battle round, a singer would be sent by his or her teammates to compete against another singer from the opposing team. The selection of the singer and their order of appearance were all decided by their respective teams, and all of which were done without the knowledge of the opposing team. Therefore, the pairings were completely by random, and would only be revealed when the teams revealed their selection on stage. The order of the matchup were done through Rock–paper–scissors, and the winner earned the right to decide the order. At the end of each match, the judges will cast their vote to which singer they liked the most, but those votes does not necessarily affect the outcome of the competition. At the end of all five matches, the group with a higher combined total (based on this round) will directly advance to the next round, while singers from the losing group were eligible for elimination based on the combined scores received from both rounds. FLY Entertainment artist Irene Ang was brought in as the guest judge.
Theme: The songs of my Life

 Color key

The Blue Team's total score was incorrectly announced as 349.2.

Week 10-12 (22/29 June/6 July)- Top 9 Rounds- PK Battle
For the next three weeks, the top nine singers faced head-to-head against the Season 1 singers; both the order of performance and their match-up were determined by ballot, with the Season 1 finalist performing first. The results of the battle were not were not announced until Week 12; victorious singers will directly advance to the top seven rounds; of the defeated singers, the one singer which was not saved by the judges will be eliminated, while the other singers will have to sing again on the Breakthrough round next week. The scores were not used for the results, and scores for the prior round were reset. Top 20 finalist Xie Wen made his cameo appearance during Week 12 episode.
Theme: No theme

 Color key

Week 13 (13 July)- Top 8 Round- Breakthrough Round
The next two shows were taped at the open field near Arumugam Road at MacPherson for a crowd of 1,200 people. In this round, the five singers who were defeated in the top nine rounds performed for a chance to stay in the competition. The order of performance was decided by the judges. For this week, in addition to the four scoring components, a fifth component, "Breakthrough Index" was added, and each component carries a 20-point weightage. The singer with the lowest score will be eliminated from the competition.
Theme: Songs to achieve breakthrough

 Color key

Week 14 (20 July)- Top 7 Round- Popularity Round
The top seven performed on this week for a spot in the semi-finals. The order of appearance was decided through the drawing of lots. In deciding who moves on, the three judges; as well as the studio audience made up of 300 members of the public were given an equal say. Each of the voters was entitled to one vote per singer, and they can either choose to vote or not vote for a particular singer. The scores from the judges, as well as the total number of votes cast by studio audience converted into points accordingly to the percentage of the valid votes cast. The singer with the lowest accumulated total points would be eliminated from the competition.
Theme: No theme

 Color key

The percentage counting towards the total votes does not include 49 abstained/rejected votes.

Week 15/16 (27 July/3 August)- Semi-Finals
The Semi-finals was split into two episodes, with the entire first round and the first two singers from the second round performing on the first episode, and the last four on the second episode. In the first round, six singers received their paper cutouts from the producers, which determined their pairing and performance order; the scores for this round (which include Team Chemistry; each component now have a 20-point weightage) were judged based on the duet itself, rather than judging individually (meaning both singers from the same duet were given identical set of scores). In the second round, judge Jim Lim handpicked six songs for the singers to choose from (with the order of choice based on their placement from the Popularity round), and work on a song mixed with two genres  original and designated, with the latter unknown to the contestant's knowledge until the start of the round. The scores for both rounds were combined and calculated by average; normally, the two singers receiving the two lowest scores would be eliminated from the competition; however, after two singers (Angie Lau and Cola Lau) were tied for fourth place, both singers were advanced to the Grand Finals. Director of Getai musical film 881 and music video "大家兴旺发" Royston Tan was brought in as the guest judge.
Theme: Singer's duets, Jim Lim's choice

 Color key

Tied for fourth place.

Week 17 (10 August)- Grand Finals
The Grand Finals were taped on 26 July 2018 and broadcast on a two-hour special starting at 10.30am. In the first round of the competition, the five finalists performed a duet with celebrities (if any). Based on the judges scores (40 for singing techniques, 30 each for stage presence and presentation) in the first round, the bottom three singers with the lowest judges' score would be eliminated.

The final two singers would then sing their winner's song in the second round of the competition; the singer who received the highest total combined score was announced as the winner. Actor Cavin Soh and guest singer Daniel Luo were brought in as the guest judges. Senior Minister of State, Information and Communication & Culture, Community and Youth, Sim Ann, was the guest-of-honour for the finale. A special teaser for the talkshow The Love 97.2 Breakfast Quartet - Listen To Me (which premieres the week after) was shown during the closing of the show.
Theme: Celebrity duets (billed as "reinforcement round"), winner's song (billed as "final battle")
Group Performance: "海草舞" (all season 1 and 2 finalists except Jason Chung, Angie Lau, Cola Lau, Jessie Yeong and Zhuang Qing Yu)
Non-competition Performances: Jessie Yeong ("酒后的心声"), Jason Chung ("让我跟你走"), Cola Lau ("一百万"), Zhuang Qing Yu ("蝴蝶"), Angie Lau ("归来吧")
Musical Guests: Season 1 finalists ("大家兴旺发"), Daniel Luo ("茫茫到更深")

References

2018 Singaporean television seasons